Franklin Springfield Motor Co. Building, also known as the Proctor Motor Co., Indiana Trucks, Inc., and The White Motor Co., is a historic automobile showroom located in Springfield, Missouri, United States. Built about 1891 and renovated about 1925, it is a two-story commercial building with a yellow brick veneer facade with limestone trim. The building measures 45 feet wide and 100 feet deep.

It was listed on the National Register of Historic Places in 2006. It is located in the Springfield Public Square Historic District.

References

Individually listed contributing properties to historic districts on the National Register in Missouri
Commercial buildings on the National Register of Historic Places in Missouri
Commercial buildings completed in 1925
Buildings and structures in Springfield, Missouri
National Register of Historic Places in Greene County, Missouri
Auto dealerships on the National Register of Historic Places